The South Australian Archaeology Society is an avocational archaeology organisation operating in South Australia.  It evolved from the Society for Underwater Historical Research which was renamed in March 2012 as part of a plan to create an organisation with a broader community base in archaeological practice.

References

Archaeological organizations
2012 establishments in Australia
Clubs and societies in South Australia